Islamabad, the capital of Pakistan, is home to numerous tourist attractions. Daman-i-Koh, Margalla Zoo, Pakistan Monument, Faisal Mosque, Shakarparian, Lok Virsa Museum and Rawal lake view point are among the top tourist attractions in Islamabad. It also acts as a stop for journeys to Murree and Northern Pakistan when travelling from Pakistani provinces of Punjab, Sindh, and sometimes even Balochistan.

General

 Faisal Masjid
 Centaurus
 Daman-e-Koh
 The Monal Restaurant
 Islamabad Zoo
 Lok Virsa Museum
 Margalla Hills
 Murree Hills
 National Herbarium Islamabad
 National Monument Islamabad
 National Museum of Natural History
 Neela Sandh
 Nilan Bhotu
 Pak-China Friendship Centre
 Pir Sohawa
 Rawal Lake
 Shahdara Village
 Shakarparian
 Lotus Lake

Rock climbing
There are many spots for rock climbing in Margalla Hills, including Jungle Rock (F 6a:8a), God Rock (F 6b+:7b), Legacy Wall (F 6a:7c+),  Jasmin Corner (F 4b:5a), Belvedere (F 4c:6b+), Hidden Rock (F 6a:6c), Music Lounge (F 5c:6c) Beetle’s Nest (F 5b:6c+, including multi-pitch route), Well Hidden Rock (F 5a:8a), Holiday Rock (F 5b:5b), Said Pur View (F 5c:8a) and Shaddarrah (F 5c:6a).

Parks

 Ayub National Park
Ankara Park
 Fatima Jinnah Park
 Japanese Park
 Lake View Park
 Playland
 Rose & Jasmine Garden

Museums and art galleries

 Lok Virsa Museum
 Golra Sharif Railway Museum
 National Art Gallery, Islamabad
 Pakistan Museum of Natural History

Model villages
 Potohari Arts & Craft Village
 Saidpur Village Resort

Mosques and shrines

 Baba Badshah Bani Gala
 Bari Imaam
 Shah Faisal Mosque
 Golra Sharif

Food streets
 Melody Food Street
 Aabpara Food Street
 Blue Area Food Street
 Naan Street in PWD Islamabad

Sporting facilities
 Jinnah Sports Stadium
 Liaquat Gymnasium

Main markets

Markaz and bazaars

Every populated sector in Islamabad has a main market/bazaar referred to as a markaz. 
 Aabpara Market (G-6)
 Allah Wali Market (F-8/1)
 Ayyub Market/F-8 Markaz
 Cafe Irum Market (G-6/2)
 Jinnah Super Market/F-7 Markaz
 Friday and Sunday Bazar (near Peshawar Morr Interchange and G-6)
 Karachi Company/G-9 Markaz
 Mediterranean Food Court Diplomatic Enclave/G-5 Markaz
 Super Market/F-6 Markaz

Malls 
 Centaurus Mall
 Emporium Mall (under construction)
 Giga Mall
 Olympus Mall
 Pak China Mall
 Safa Gold Mall
 Zeta 1 Mall (under construction)

Government buildings

 Aiwan-e-Sadr - President's official residence
 National Institute of Health
 National Parliament of Pakistan
 Supreme Court of Pakistan

See also

 Developments in Islamabad

Notes

References

External links

 Pakistan Tourism Development Corporation, PTDC

Tourist attractions
Tourist attractions
Islamabad
Islamabad